Yong Hoon Lee is the President of Ajou University, South Korea. He is a mathematician.

Early life
Born in Buyeo, South Korea, Park studied physics at Seoul National University and received his undergraduate degree in 1986. He then received a Ph.D. degree in mathematics at University of California, Berkeley, USA in 1995.

Career
From 1995-2004, Park was with the Department of Mathematics at Oakland University, California, USA as an professor. From 2004-2009, he was professor at School of Computational Sciences, Korean Institute for Advanced Study. From 2009-2015. he was professor at School of Mathematics, POSTECH. From 2015-2018, he was a chair professor at Ajou University. In 2018, he became President of Ajou University.

Professional activity
Park was a member of the executive committee of the Korean Mathematical Society from 2005-2006. He was President of the National Institute for Mathematical Sciences from 2015-2017.

References

21st-century South Korean mathematicians
Seoul National University alumni
University of California, Berkeley alumni
Academic staff of Pohang University of Science and Technology
1964 births
Living people
Academic staff of Ajou University
Presidents of universities and colleges in South Korea
20th-century South Korean mathematicians